The 1981 Trans America Athletic Conference baseball tournament was held at Hunter Field on the campus of Hardin–Simmons University in Abilene, Texas, from April 30 through May 2. This was the third tournament championship held by the Trans America Athletic Conference, in its third year of existence. Mercer won their second tournament championship.

Seeding and format 
The TAAC established two divisions beginning in 1981, and brought the two division winners and second place team from each division to the tournament. Each division winner played the opposite division runner up in the first round in the four team double elimination tournament. Hardin-Simmons claimed the West's top seed by tiebreaker.

Results

All-Tournament Team 
The following players were named to the All-Tournament Team. No MVP was named until 1985.

References 

Tournament
ASUN Conference Baseball Tournament
Trans America Athletic Conference baseball tournament
Trans America Athletic Conference baseball tournament
Trans America Athletic Conference baseball tournament
Baseball in Abilene, Texas